Nigeria became an independent country on 1 October 1960 and in 1963 became the Federal Republic of Nigeria. The republic instituted two orders of merit: the Order of the Niger and the Order of the Federal Republic.

Award 
The two highest honours, the Grand Commander in the Order of the Federal Republic and Grand Commander in the Order of the Niger are awarded to the president and vice-president respectively. The presiding judge in the Supreme Court and the chairman of the Senate are qualitative and ex officio commander in the Order of the Niger.

Grades 
The Nigerians followed the British example in the form and structure of the order. Similarly, there are post-nominal letters for members of the Order of the Niger.
 Grand Commander of the Order of the Niger (GCON)
 Commander of the Order of the Niger (CON)
 Officer of the Order of the Niger (OON)
 Member of the Order of the Niger (MON)

The order has a Civil Division and a Military Division. The ribbon of the latter division has a small red line in the middle.

Notable recipients
Notable recipients include:

References

External links
World Medals Index, Nigeria: Order of the Niger

Orders, decorations, and medals of Nigeria
Orders of chivalry awarded to heads of state, consorts and sovereign family members
 
Awards established in 1963
1963 establishments in Nigeria